Andrée Micheline Ghislaine Tainsy (26 April 1911 – 19 December 2004) was a Belgian actress.   She worked with several notable actors like Philippe Noiret, Jean Louis Trintignant, Charlotte Rampling and famous directors like Claude Chabrol, Costas Gavras and François Ozon.  Tainsy began her career with theater plays and her first film debut was in 1945, followed by over 80 different cinema and TV works as co-star.  She worked until the day of her death.

Early life
She was born in Etterbeek, Belgium.

Career
Andrée Tainsy attended Brussels' Conservatory, where she trained to become a theater performer in the early 1930s. She moved to Paris and made her debut with the Georges Pitoëff theatrical company in Les Voyageurs Sans Bagage (1937). Her film debut was ready in 1939 however, as World War II started, she fled to South America, where she reconnected with other artists who had also left.  Her first experience in front of was in Chile a movie camera and in 1945 her movie career began starring in Jacques Remy's Le Moulin des Andes (Released in Chile as La Fruta Mordida).

Upon her return to France, after the end of the war, she resumed her theatrical activity with Les Amants de Noël and Joyeux Chagrins, both in 1948.  Tainsy's career as an actress and comedian went on until the very end of her life. She worked until the day of her death.  She appeared in a small role in Arnaud Desplechin's Rois et Reine on 22 December 2004, just three days after she died.  Her cinema endeavors comprised works with several directors like Bertrand Tavernier, Woody Allen, Claude Chabrol, François Ozon and Arnaud Desplechin.

Later life
On 19 December 2004, after attending a presentation of a play by Pierre Desproges, she suffered a heart attack at her Parisian apartment. She was buried at Père-Lachaise Cemetery in Paris.

Selected filmography

1945: La fruta mordida
1949: Fantômas contre Fantômas - (uncredited)
1949: Mission in Tangier - La balayeuse du cabaret
1949: Au royaume des cieux - La fille de cuisine
1950: Botta e risposta
1950: Plus de vacances pour le Bon Dieu
1950: Julie de Carneilhan - Madame Sabrier
1951: Ma femme est formidable - La femme de chambre
1952: Agence matrimoniale - (uncredited)
1952: Holiday for Henrietta - (uncredited)
1953: Le chevalier de la nuit - L'habilleuse
1954: La neige était sale - (uncredited)
1956: Marie Antoinette Queen of France - Une émeutière (uncredited)
1956: Manequins de Paris
1956: Les Lumières du soir - Une demandeuse d'emploi
1957: Demoniac (1957) - La vendeuse de cartes de viste
1958: Le septième ciel - Madame Helier (uncredited)
1958: One Life (Original title Une vie) - Ludivine - la servante
1958: Young Sinners - La réceptionniste (uncredited)
1959: Maigret et l'Affaire Saint-Fiacre - La patronne du Hula-Hoop (uncredited)
1960: Love and the Frenchwoman - (segment "Femme Seule, La") (uncredited)
1961: Bernadette of Lourdes
1962: Portrait-robot
1964: Diary of a Chambermaid - La paysanne
1964: Fantômas - L'habilleuse
1965: Les Bons Vivants - Germaine (segment "Bons vivants, Les") (uncredited)
1966: Les ruses du diable (Neuf portraits d'une jeune fille) - La mère de Ginette
1966: Le chien fou
1969: Z - La mère de Nick
1970: L'étrangleur - Mme Jeanne, la patronne du bar restaurant
1970: Trop petit mon ami - Mme Herbin
1970: Pele de Asno - La mère
1971: Man with the Transplanted Brain 
1972: Faustine et le Bel Été - Grandmother
1972: Beau masque
1973: A Slightly Pregnant Man - Clarisse de Saint-Clair, une cliente du salon
1974: The Clockmaker of Saint Paul (Original title L'Horloger de Saint-Paul) - Madeleine Fourmet - qui a élevé Bernard
1975: That Most Important Thing: Love - La mère de Jacques (scenes deleted)
1975: Let Joy Reign Supreme - La religieuse
1975: Love and Death - (uncredited)
1977: Solemn Communion - Charlotte Fourcignie
1977: Spoiled Children - Madame Descombes
1977: Gloria - Estelle - la gouvernante
1977: A. Constant - Jeanne
1978: The Paradise of Riches (Original title Le Paradis des Riches) - Albertine
1978: Adieu voyages lents - La mère / Simone's Mother
1979: Twee vrouwen
1980: Ali in Wonderland
1981: Seuls - La tante
1981: Et pourtant elle tourne... - La grand-mère de Jeanne
1982: Boulevard des assassins - Mme Graveline
1985: Cop au Vin (Original title Poulet au Vinaigre) - Marthe
1993: Mensonge - Maria
1996: Le coeur fantôme - The old lady
1996: Love, etc. - Mireille
2000: Code Unknown - Mrs. Becker
2000: Under the Sand (Original title Sous le Sable* 1996  Love, etc - Suzanne
2003: Dans le rouge du couchant - Princesse Czerny
2003: Après vous... - Louis' Grandmother
2004: Kings and Queens (Original title Rois et Reine) - La grand-mère (final film role)

References

External links

1911 births
2004 deaths
People from Etterbeek
French film actresses
French stage actresses
French television actresses
Belgian film actresses
Belgian stage actresses
Belgian television actresses
20th-century Belgian actresses
21st-century Belgian actresses
Burials at Père Lachaise Cemetery
20th-century French women